Darar 2 is an unreleased Indian, Bhojpuri language film directed by Sushil Kumar Upadhyay and produced by Ranjit Singh under banner of "Ranjit Singh Entertainment". The stars Ritesh Pandey, Joginder Tiwari, Pravesh Lal Yadav, Kajal Raghwani, Anjana Singh, Shubhi Sharma, Tanushree Chatterjee and Gunjan Pant in lead roles while Anil Samrat, Sanjay Pandey, Sushil Singh, Maya Yadav, Kunal Singh and Prakash Jais in supporting role. It is a sequel of 2010 film Daraar. Khesari Lal Yadav and Chandni Singh make a special appearance with a song.

Cast
 Samrat Yaduvanshi
 Ritesh Pandey
 Joginder Tiwari
 Pravesh Lal Yadav
 Rakesh Mishra
 Kajal Raghwani
 Anjana Singh 
 Shubhi Sharma
 Gunjan Pant
 Tanushree Chatterjee
 Maya Yadav
 Sanjay Pandey
 Sushil Singh 
 Kunal Singh
 Prakash Jais
 Khesari Lal Yadav
 Chandni Singh

Music
The soundtrack of "Darar 2" was composed by Shekar Madhur and Kundan Preet with lyrics penned by Pyare Lal Yadav and Ashok Kumar Deep. It was produced under "Yashi Films" Label, who also bought his digital satellite rights.

References

External links

Upcoming Bhojpuri-language films
Indian sequel films
Unreleased Indian films